In electrical engineering, the Y-Δ transform, also written wye-delta and also known by many other names, is a mathematical technique to simplify the analysis of an electrical network. The name derives from the shapes of the circuit diagrams, which look respectively like the letter Y and the Greek capital letter Δ. This circuit transformation theory was published by Arthur Edwin Kennelly in 1899. It is widely used in analysis of three-phase electric power circuits. 

The Y-Δ transform can be considered a special case of the star-mesh transform for three resistors.  In mathematics, the Y-Δ transform plays an important role in theory of circular planar graphs.

Names

The Y-Δ transform is known by a variety of other names, mostly based upon the two shapes involved, listed in either order. The Y, spelled out as wye, can also be called T or star; the Δ, spelled out as delta, can also be called triangle, Π (spelled out as pi), or mesh. Thus, common names for the transformation include wye-delta or delta-wye, star-delta, star-mesh, or T-Π.

Basic Y-Δ transformation

The transformation is used to establish equivalence for networks with three terminals. Where three elements terminate at a common node and none are sources, the node is eliminated by transforming the impedances. For equivalence, the impedance between any pair of terminals must be the same for both networks. The equations given here are valid for complex as well as real impedances. Complex impedance is a quantity measured in ohms which represents resistance as positive real numbers in the usual manner, and also represents reactance as positive and negative imaginary values.

Equations for the transformation from Δ to Y
The general idea is to compute the impedance  at a terminal node of the Y circuit with impedances ,  to adjacent nodes in the Δ circuit by

where  are all impedances in the Δ circuit. This yields the specific formula

Equations for the transformation from Y to Δ
The general idea is to compute an impedance  in the Δ circuit by

The formulae for the individual edges are thus

Or, if using admittance instead of resistance:

Note that the general formula in Y to Δ using admittance is similar to Δ to Y using resistance.

A proof of the existence and uniqueness of the transformation
The feasibility of the transformation can be shown as a consequence of the superposition theorem for electric circuits. A short proof, rather than one derived as a corollary of the more general star-mesh transform, can be given as follows. The equivalence lies in the statement that for any external voltages ( and ) applying at the three nodes ( and ), the corresponding currents ( and ) are exactly the same for both the Y and Δ circuit, and vice versa. In this proof, we start with given external currents at the nodes. According to the superposition theorem, the voltages can be obtained by studying the superposition of the resulting voltages at the nodes of the following three problems applied at the three nodes with current:

 
  and
 

The equivalence can be readily shown by using Kirchhoff's circuit laws that . Now each problem is relatively simple, since it involves only one single ideal current source. To obtain exactly the same outcome voltages at the nodes for each problem, the equivalent resistances in the two circuits must be the same, this can be easily found by using the basic rules of series and parallel circuits:

Though usually six equations are more than enough to express three variables in term of the other three variables(), here it is straightforward to show that these equations indeed lead to the above designed expressions.

In fact, the superposition theorem establishes the relation between the values of the resistances, the uniqueness theorem guarantees the uniqueness of such solution.

Simplification of networks
Resistive networks between two terminals can theoretically be simplified to a single equivalent resistor (more generally, the same is true of impedance). Series and parallel transforms are basic tools for doing so, but for complex networks such as the bridge illustrated here, they do not suffice. 

The Y-Δ transform can be used to eliminate one node at a time and produce a network that can be further simplified, as shown. 

The reverse transformation, Δ-Y, which adds a node, is often handy to pave the way for further simplification as well.

Every two-terminal network represented by a planar graph can be reduced to a single equivalent resistor by a sequence of series, parallel, Y-Δ, and Δ-Y transformations.  However, there are non-planar networks that cannot be simplified using these transformations, such as a regular square grid wrapped around a torus, or any member of the Petersen family.

Graph theory
In graph theory, the Y-Δ transform means replacing a Y subgraph of a graph with the equivalent Δ subgraph. The transform preserves the number of edges in a graph, but not the number of vertices or the number of cycles. Two graphs are said to be Y-Δ equivalent if one can be obtained from the other by a series of Y-Δ transforms in either direction. For example, the Petersen family is a Y-Δ equivalence class.

Demonstration

Δ-load to Y-load transformation equations

The impedance in either configuration is determined as if one of the nodes is disconnected from the circuit.
 
The impedance between N1 and N2 with N3 disconnected in Δ:

Thus,

The corresponding impedance between N1 and N2 in Y is simple:

hence:

   (1)

Repeating for :

   (2)

and for :

   (3)

From here, the values of  can be determined by linear combination (addition and/or subtraction).

For example, adding (1) and (3), then subtracting (2) yields

For completeness:

   (4)
   (5)
   (6)

Y-load to Δ-load transformation equations
Let 

.

We can write the Δ to Y equations as

   (1)
   (2)
   (3)

Multiplying the pairs of equations yields

   (4)
   (5)
   (6)

and the sum of these equations is

   (7)

   (8)

Note the similarity between (8) and {(1), (2), (3)}

Divide (8) by (1)

Δ to Y transformation of a practical generator

During the analysis of balanced three-phase power systems, usually an equivalent per-phase (or single-phase) circuit is analyzed instead due to its simplicity. For that, equivalent wye connections are used for generators, transformers, loads and motors. The stator windings of a practical delta-connected three-phase generator, shown in the following figure, can be converted to an equivalent wye-connected generator, using the six following formulas:

The resulting network is the following. The neutral node of the equivalent network is fictitious, and so are the line-to-neutral phasor voltages. During the transformation, the line phasor currents and the line (or line-to-line or phase-to-phase) phasor voltages are not altered.

If the actual delta generator is balanced, meaning that the internal phasor voltages have the same magnitude and are phase-shifted by 120° between each other and the three complex impedances are the same, then the previous formulas reduce to the four following:

where for the last three equations, the first sign (+) is used if the phase sequence is positive/abc or the second sign (−) is used if the phase sequence is negative/acb.

See also
 Star-mesh transform
 Network analysis (electrical circuits)
 Electrical network, three-phase power, polyphase systems for examples of Y and Δ connections
 AC motor for a discussion of the Y-Δ starting technique

References

Notes

Bibliography
 William Stevenson, Elements of Power System Analysis 3rd ed., McGraw Hill, New York, 1975,

External links
 Star-Triangle Conversion: Knowledge on resistive networks and resistors
 Calculator of Star-Triangle transform

Electrical circuits
Electric power
Graph operations
Circuit theorems
Three-phase AC power